Lazzo is an American record producer, audio engineer, and songwriter, specializing in the rock, electronic, dance, and pop genres. In late 2013, he released his Wammy (Washington Area Music Association / WAMA) award-winning dance/dubstep remix album with Rites of Ash, Kept Me Up All Night.  In October 2014, Rites of Ash released their new album titled Kill For Love. He has had his music featured on numerous MTV shows, FUSE, MTV2, and MTVu, as well as shared the stage with many national artists.

Lazzo primarily works on music and radio production with DJ Boy Collective and DJ Boy Radio; recent projects include: the Aeropostale PS Mobile Application (2013), The Screening Room Express Radio (2014), Sub Pop Radio (2014), Fedde Le Grand Radio (2014), and Kill Rock Stars Radio (2014). In Summer 2014, Lazzo and his DJ Boy team taught a Master’s Class at the Los Angeles Grammy Camp. Lazzo is a member of ASCAP, the Grammy Recording Academy (NARAS) and voting member, and the Washington Area Music Association (WAMA).

Rites of Ash
With the band, Lazzo has appeared in three professional music videos which aired on Fuse TV and licensed music for ten MTV shows, including "The Real World" and "Pimp My Ride".

In 2014, he won a Wammy (WAMA) Award with Rites of Ash for Best Electronic Record (Kept Me Up All Night); he and the band were nominated for two other awards: Best Electronica Artist and Producer of the Year.  In 2015, Rites of Ash was nominated for the Best Modern Rock Band Wammy award.

Blue Skies and Death
In late 2015, Lazzo teamed up with Analytics (vocals, keyboards) to form the synth pop duo Blue Skies and Death.  The group's third single, "Parallel Lines", has been featured on Spotify's official playlists: Discover Weekly, Release Radar, and Indie Electronics.  Their EP, Rearrange, was released on September 19, 2016.

Discography

Singles
 Lazzo - "Life Moves Pretty Fast" (2020)
 Lazzo - "Direction" (feat. Omar Ruiz & Douglas Lira) (2019)
 Lazzo - "Synful" (2019)
 Rites of Ash - "Hallo Spaceboy" (2018)
 Blue Skies and Death - "Hey Wait" (2018)
 Blue Skies and Death - "Parallel Lines" (Lazzo Remix) (2016)
 Blue Skies and Death - "Sometimes" (2017)
 Blue Skies and Death - "Innocence of Youth" (2017)
 Blue Skies and Death - "Just Can't" (2017)
 Blue Skies and Death - "Parallel Lines" (2016)
 Blue Skies and Death - "Little Things" (2016)
 Lazzo - "Just Lie" (2016)
 Blue Skies and Death - "Trainwreck" (feat. Artem Grigoryev) (2015)
 Rites of Ash - "Separate Ways (Worlds Apart)" (2014)
 Rites of Ash - "Bad Romance" (2010)
 Rites of Ash - "Burn" (2009)

EPs/LPs
 Blue Skies and Death - A Way Back Home (2019)
 Lazzo - Square One (2017)
 Blue Skies and Death - Rearrange (2016)
 Rites of Ash - Kill For Love (2014)
 Rites of Ash - Kept Me Up All Night (2013)
 Rites of Ash - She's Out For Blood (2012)
 Rites of Ash - Like Venom (2010)
 Rites of Ash - Epidemic of the Mannequins (2008)
 Rites of Ash - Beautiful Illusions (2006)

Videography
 Parallel Lines (2016)
 Just Lie (feat. Lisa Christine) (2016)
 Separate Ways (Worlds Apart) (2014)
 Molly (2012)
 Killing Me (2012)
 Burn (2009)

Television
 Fuse On-Demand
 The Real World: Key West
 Pimp My Ride
 Next
 My Sweet Sixteen: Remix
 Real World/Road Rules: Gauntlet 2
 Island Life
 Livin La Haina

Movies
 City of Lost Souls

Awards
Washington Area Music Association (WAMA) / The Musicianship  
 2020 Best Electronic/Techno Artist/Group (Nominated)
 2015 Best Modern Rock Group (Nominated)
 2014 Best Electronica Recording - Kept Me Up All Night (Won)
 2014 Best Electronica Artist (Nominated)
 2014 Producer of the Year - Lazzo (Nominated)
 2010 Best Modern Rock Group (Nominated)
 2010 Best Modern Rock Recording - Like Venom (Nominated)

References

American rock keyboardists
Record producers from Washington, D.C.
Musicians from Washington, D.C.
American audio engineers
Living people
Year of birth missing (living people)